Sinkin is an extinct town in northern Shannon County, in the U.S. state of Missouri. The community was located on a sharp meander in Sinking Creek at an area known as The Sinks where the stream goes underground for a short distance.

A post office called Sinkin was established in 1869, and remained in operation until 1933. The community took its name from nearby Sinking Creek.

References

Ghost towns in Missouri
Ghost towns in Shannon County, Missouri